Ralf Loose (born 5 January 1963) is a German football coach and former player who last managed Swiss club Winterthur. He is most noted for his stint with the Liechtenstein national football team.

Playing career
Loose played as a sweeper between 1981 and 1986 for Borussia Dortmund, and also for a year for Rot-Weiß Oberhausen. Between 1987 and 1994 he was at Fortuna Düsseldorf. He has also been captain for the Germany national under-21 football team.

Managing career
Between 1996 and 1998 Loose was the coach for the Liechtenstein Under-18s team. On 1 July 1998, he was appointed to Liechtenstein national team manager.  Ralf held this position until 29 July 2003. On 1 July 2004, he became coach at a regional team Sportfreunde Siegen. After a brief spell with FC St. Gallen he returned to Sportfreunde Siegen. Ralf Loose replaced Rainer Hörgl as coach at FC Augsburg in October 2007. Loose was sacked in April 2008, after a dismal season that has left Augsburg teetering close to relegation. He was appointed as manager of Dynamo Dresden in April 2011. He earned promotion in his first season, after a playoff victory over VfL Osnabrück, but was sacked in December 2012, after a poor start to the 2012–13 season.

Loose was appointed manager of Swiss Challenge League club, FC Winterthur on 1 July 2019

References

1963 births
Living people
German footballers
Germany youth international footballers
Germany under-21 international footballers
Borussia Dortmund players
Borussia Dortmund II players
Fortuna Düsseldorf players
Rot-Weiß Oberhausen players
Bundesliga players
2. Bundesliga players
German football managers
Footballers from Dortmund
FC Augsburg managers
FC St. Gallen managers
German expatriate football managers
Expatriate football managers in Liechtenstein
German expatriate sportspeople in Liechtenstein
Expatriate football managers in Switzerland
German expatriate sportspeople in Switzerland
Liechtenstein national football team managers
Dynamo Dresden managers
Sportfreunde Siegen managers
2. Bundesliga managers
SC Preußen Münster managers
Association football defenders
Association football midfielders
3. Liga managers
FC Winterthur managers